John Hegnauer  is an American stone carver.

Life
John Hegnauer studied Biology at Chicago's Northwestern University. He came to Newport, Rhode Island, in 1962 to work with John "Fud" Benson in The John Stevens Shop. Together they worked on the  inscriptions on the John F. Kennedy memorial at the Arlington National Cemetery. In 1979 Hegnauer left the shop and set up his own shop in Portsmouth, Rhode Island. His work appears on the Robert F. Kennedy memorial in Arlington National Cemetery, Dallas Museum of Art, Massachusetts State House, Virginia Museum of Art, and Boston City Hall among other sites. At Harvard University he designed plaque to commemorate Harvard's Indian College., and a sundial at Lamont Library. He also taught courses in lettering and has had student apprentices from the Rhode Island School of Design. He has since retired and now lives in Newfoundland.

References

External links
Final Marks, The Art of the Carved Letter (1979), by Frank Muhly, Jr., Peter O'Neill

American typographers and type designers
Stone carvers
Living people
Year of birth missing (living people)
Northwestern University alumni
Place of birth missing (living people)